José Antonio Rueda Ruiz (born 29 October 2005) is a Spanish motorcycle racer who currently competes for Red Bull KTM Ajo in the Moto3 World Championship. He won the FIM JuniorGP World Championship and the Red Bull MotoGP Rookies Cup in 2022.

Career statistics

Grand Prix motorcycle racing

By season

By class

Races by year
(key) (Races in bold indicate pole position; races in italics indicate fastest lap)

References

External links

2005 births
Living people
Sportspeople from Seville
Spanish motorcycle racers
Moto3 World Championship riders